Gurdeep Pandher is a Sikh-Canadian, Yukon-based author, teacher and performer, who makes Punjabi dance videos. Gurdeep was born into a farming family, in a small village in Siahar, Punjab.  He moved to Canada in 2006 and became a Canadian citizen in 2011. Moving to Canada inspired him to tour the entire country and further understand his adopted nation. He has lived in numerous Canadian provinces, including small Canadian villages, but found his home in a wilderness cabin in Yukon.

Gurdeep teaches diverse groups across Canada, building cross-cultural bridges and encouraging acceptance, inclusivity and positive race-relations. In an effort to promote intercultural understanding throughout Canada, Gurdeep has blended Bhangra with various other cultural dances present in the country. Gurdeep's Yukon-made Bhangra videos have gone on to inspire people everywhere, including Quebec where his work was featured in French-Canadian media outlets. In addition to this, Gurdeep has also appeared on British television network ITV, during the breakfast show hosted by Lorraine Kelly, on Canadian entertainment show, CTV's eTalk, and Rachel Maddow also featured Gurdeep's work on her show on MSNBC. He is best known for promoting motivation and optimism during the COVID-19 pandemic in Yukon to Canada's coast to coast to coast. In an effort to spread awareness about the COVID-19 vaccine, Gurdeep Pandher made a Bhangra dance video on a frozen lake in Yukon, which was watched by millions across the globe. Gurdeep is also notable for using dance as a mechanism to break down barriers which BIPOC face. According to CBC, "Gurdeep Pandher could be considered Yukon's most famous person on social media."

Viral Videos

Canada Day Video 
Gurdeep's first viral video was in 2016 which featured a Canada Day performance in Whitehorse, Yukon. The video depicts Gurdeep and his dance partner, Manuela Haemmerli performing Bhangra and dancing to Punjabi music with Yukon residents. Overnight, the video received upwards of 250,000 views and was later featured on CBC News and CTV News.

Video with Whitehorse Mayor 
In 2017, Gurdeep Pandher created a video in collaboration with Whitehorse Mayor Dan Curtis. In the video, Gurdeep taught the mayor how to tie and wear a traditional Sikh turban and the pair danced Bhangra together. The video quickly became a viral sensation, receiving over one million views in a single day and a segment on BBC News, Toronto Star, and The Huffington Post. Together Mayor Dan Curtis and Gurdeep Pandher made the video to spread a message of diversity and inclusivity throughout the world.

Paralympian Stephanie Dixon and Gurdeep Pandher Advocate for Inclusivity in Cultures and Sports 
Stephanie Dixon is a Canadian swimmer, who was awarded fifteen medals at the Paralympic Games throughout her career. The Government of Canada added her achievements to Canada's Sports Hall of Fame and in 2017, awarded her the Member of the Order of Canada. That same year, Gurdeep Pandher and Stephanie Dixon joined forces to create a viral video. In the video, both Stephanie and Gurdeep perform a Bhangra routine and swim together in the Yukon hot springs. Over 100,000 people on social media have viewed the video. Gurdeep and Stephanie designed the video to promote a message of cultural diversity and inclusivity in sports.

Can-Can Dancers and Bhangra Fusion 
Gurdeep Pandher and the Yukon Rendezvous Air North Can-Can Line created a breathtaking fusion of two famous dance forms, Punjabi Bhangra and Can-Can Dancing. Their video supports bringing together two distinct cultures in the world. Originating in France, the Can-Can is a high-energy, physically demanding dance that became popular in music halls in the 1840s. This video demonstrates the utilization of social media to build cross-cultural bridges.

The Canadian Armed Forces Collaboration 
In 2019, The Canadian Armed Forces and Gurdeep Pandher collaborated to create a Punjabi Bhangra dance video to celebrate diversity and inclusivity in the Canadian military. The video brought together soldiers from differing backgrounds and promoted a message of “One Force” with “One Love” for Canadians. It was unique, as it was the first time The Canadian Armed Forces participated in a collaboration that included folk-dance from Canada's Punjabi/Sikh nation. In addition to this, the video showcased Canadian BIPOC soldiers dancing and performing Bhangra together.

A diverse range of the soldiers participated in the video including members of The Royal Canadian Navy, The Royal Canadian Air Force and The Canadian Army. Filming took place at the Canadian Forces Base (CFB) at Esquimalt, located west of Victoria, British Columbia. The video went viral and was shared and recognized by many prominent Canadian figures. The Prime Minister of Canada Justin Trudeau, shared Gurdeep's video to his social media. The video was also later shared by Canada's Minister of National Defence, Harjit Sajjan. In addition to this, the collaboration received positive feedback from the existing Commander of The Royal Canadian Navy at that time, Art McDonald. The now Chief of the Defence Staff tweeted, "As @CanadianForces & @RoyalCanNavy prepare to celebrate Canada Day here at home & overseas (& at-sea!) when duty brings us there, it seems this is the perfect time to celebrate the spirit of inclusion & diversity that is the Canadian advantage! #BravoZulu & T.Y. for this video shipmates."

Dance with Indigenous Chief of Vuntut Gwitchin First Nation, Old Crow, Yukon 
Gurdeep Pandher collaborated with Dana Tizya-Tramm, the Chief of a Northern Yukon indigenous community, named Old Crow. The 2019 video featured the Punjabi traditional dance, Bhangra. The notion behind the film was to celebrate friendships among communities in the Yukon and Canada.  After the video was released, Indigenous network APTN National News broadcast the footage and interviewed the Chief and Gurdeep. APTN wrote, "a video filmed in an isolated community in the Yukon meant to spread happiness has now been seen by tens of thousands of people." Old Crow is home to the Vuntut Gwitchin First Nation (VGFN) peoples'. Traditionally speaking Gwich’in, the area is home to less than 300 people. Old Crow is isolated from surrounding communities and is accessible only by plane or canoe. Chief Dana Tizya-Tramm, the head of the VGFN government, is the youngest First Nation Chief in the Yukon. He made national headlines by declaring a climate emergency in the Old Crow community. It was the first northern community to make a climate emergency declaration and inspired many municipalities in Canada to follow suit.

Bhangra in -45ºC Temperature 
In January 2020, Gurdeep Pandher recorded and produced a video where he danced Bhangra outdoors in the Yukon, Canada. In the video, the weather is intense and temperatures drop below -45ºC. The video went viral and was posted by several national media organizations including CBC. At the end of the year, CBC reported the dance video to be one of the most "uplifting videos from 2020."

Video Featuring Yukon Bagpiper Jordan Lincez 
Later that year in 2020, Jordan Lincez and Gurdeep Pandher combined Bhangra dancing to Jordan's bagpipe music. The video took place in April in the Yukon wilderness while the pair were practicing social distancing. More than 300,000 people watched the video from Gurdeep's Twitter page in one day. This video was broadcast by CBC, CTV and Global News. The Leader-Post wrote that "Gurdeep Pandher is an ambassador for joy." In addition to this, Canadian Author Heather Down included Gurdeep and Jordan in her book, Not Cancelled: Canadian Kindness in the Face of COVID-19, which chronicled positive experiences from several Canadians during the COVID-19 pandemic.

Summer Trip to Vancouver Island 
In Summer 2020, Gurdeep vacationed to Vancouver Island for ten days. Upon his arrival, he posted a video dancing Bhangra on the front lawn of the Legislative Assembly of British Columbia. Shortly after Gurdeep's post, representatives from B.C. Legislature contacted him and invited him to film a video featuring their staff. Members from all parties of the Legislative Assembly danced Bhangra with Gurdeep. Following this, Gurdeep was welcomed by the Legislature Assembly into the Victoria parliament buildings. Gurdeep was escorted by the Royal Canadian Mounted Police and was invited by the Victoria Police (VicPD) to create a video dancing Bhangra. The VicPD staff were subsequently joined by officers and staff from Saanich Police, Central Saanich Police, Oak Bay Police, Westshore RCMP, and Duncan/North Cowichan RCMP.

After leaving Victoria, Gurdeep travelled to Long Beach Tofino, creating a video performing Bhangra on the beautiful Pacific Ocean landscape. Gurdeep’s visit and interview was featured in Tofino’s Top 10 Sports and Art Stories of 2020.

He was honoured by the Fire and Rescue Department of Nanaimo. Following this, The Globe and Mail wrote, "Bhangra dancer looks to bring the message of hope to B.C. during COVID-19." Based on the events from this trip, Gurdeep landed on the cover of Explore Magazine, a Canadian adventure and outdoor lifestyle magazine.

Dancing Bhangra and Remaining Positive During the COVID-19 Pandemic 
Amid the 2020 Pandemic, Gurdeep began to offer accessible, Pay-What-You-Can, virtual Bhangra lessons. That year, over 5000 students joined the online classes during the worldwide lockdowns. As schools and learning facilities began to close and shut down, students and teachers relied on Gurdeep's videos for online, at-home learning. CBC went on to feature Gurdeep's lessons in an article. Using the virtual classes as a platform, Gurdeep raised funds for both COVID-19 relief and Mental Health research. These efforts resulted in appearances in publications from Air Canada's enRoute Magazine, the Bank of Montreal, and the International Paralympic Committee. BC's TransLink also collaborated with Gurdeep to create a Bhangra positivity video that promotes wearing masks while using the Skytrain and Transit services. In addition to these appearances, the Government of Canada requested Gurdeep Pandher, among other prominent Canadians, to make a Bhangra video to celebrate Canada Day 2020. Later that year, CBC Q's Tom Power featured Gurdeep Pandher on CBC Television in a talk show called What're You At? with Tom Power.

Gurdeep worked to produce and post one Bhangra dance video per day during the COVID-19 pandemic. His user engagement and total views grew rapidly as an increased number of people across Canada and throughout the world started watching his videos and social media posts. As COVID-19 restrictions grew tighter, many important events were cancelled. However, Gurdeeps audience found motivation and gained positivity through watching his daily videos. Gurdeep received many messages from individuals feeling an amplified amount of stress and loneliness due to the pandemic. The messages indicated that his community had felt uplifted and optimistic thanks to Gurdeep's work. On March 1, 2021, Gurdeep received his first COVID-19 vaccine. After receiving the vaccination, he visited a frozen lake in the Yukon and recorded a Bhangra dance video, which went viral.

Canadian Cross-Cultural Bhangra Concerts 
In 2016, Gurdeep was invited by local musicians to gather in Whitehorse, Yukon and practice together. During the gathering, Gurdeep began dancing Bhangra to their traditional Celtic music. As Gurdeep continued to dance and more musicians joined, the artists were surprised how well their different cultures of music and dance blended together. From this, the idea of the Cross-Cultural Bhangra Show was born and was later titled, Bhangra: Dance of Punjab, Canadian Cross-Cultural Concert. The show now has been performed consecutively for five years, taking place virtually and in the Yukon Arts Centre. Year after year, the show has continued to sell out. This annual concert is known for bringing different Canadian cultures together on one stage, providing a message of unity in diversity and building interracial bridges.

Gurdeep Pandher has taught Bhangra in the Yukon for serval years and felt it was important to include his students in Bhangra: Dance of Punjab, Canadian Cross-Cultural Concert. In the past, the concert has showcased a variety of performers including local Yukon youth, Can-can dancers, Irish dancers, Highland dancers, Japanese musicians, Celtic musicians and performances from Gurdeep’s Bhangra students. To continue to deliver the message of positive race-relations, Gurdeep also performed in the Dawson City Music Festival. He was the first to dance Bhangra in the festival's history. In addition to this, Gurdeep performed in Whitehorse, where he was joined by 60 Santas who danced Bhangra with him.

CBC Arts and Gurdeep Pandher, Happy Videos Collaboration 
The arts sector of Canadian Broadcasting Corporation (CBC), known as CBC Arts, collaborated with Gurdeep Pandher to create numerous Bhangra videos that work towards spreading joy and optimism throughout Canada. Gurdeep Pandher and CBC Arts partnered to produce a total of six videos. So far, the two videos that have been released are titled Hello Fall and Bhangra to Celtic Music.

Books

Gurdeep authored a poetry book in the Punjabi language, titled Mitti De Ghar, which translates to "Clay homes" in English. It was later published by Aarsi Publishers, a publishing company located in New Delhi. The book consists of poems and songs written by Gurdeep in his early years.

In 2023 he is slated to participate as one of the panelists in Canada Reads, championing Dimitri Nasrallah's novel Hotline.<ref>"Meet the Canada Reads 2023 contenders". CBC Books, January 25, 2023.</ref>

 Movies 
Gurdeep Pandher was invited by film makers to be featured as a guest artist in First We Eat'', a film about food sovereignty in Northern Canada. The movie was produced by Dawson City Yukon film creator Suzanne Crocker and is on the long list for best documentary at the upcoming 2020 Oscars. In the movie, Gurdeep Pandher and other characters dance Bhangra in celebration of the local harvest.

References 

Living people
Bhangra (music) musicians
Canadian male dancers
Musicians from Yukon
People from Whitehorse
Year of birth missing (living people)
21st-century Canadian dancers